Chandraseniya Kayastha Prabhu (CKP) is an ethnic group mainly found in Maharashtra. Historically, they made equally good warriors, statesmen as well as writers. They held the posts such as Deshpande and Gadkari according to the historian, B.R. Sunthankar, produced some of the best warriors in Maharashtrian History.

Traditionally, in Maharashtra, the caste structure was headed by the deshasthas, chitpawans, karhade, saraswats and the CKPs. Other than the Brahmins, the Prabhus (CKPs and Pathare Prabhus) were the communities advanced in education.

Traditionally, the CKPs have the upanayana ( janeu or thread ceremony) and have been granted the rights to study the vedas and perform vedic rituals along with the Brahmins. The CKP performed three Vedic karmas or duties which in sanskrit are called: Adhyayan- studying of the Vedas, yajna- ritual done in front of a sacred fire, often with mantras and dāna – alms or charity.
Ritually ranked very high, the caste may be considered socially proximate to the Brahmin community. They have traditionally been an elite and literate but a numerically small community.

More formally, in Maharashtra, they are one of the Prabhu Communities and a sister caste of the Pathare Prabhu. The CKP followed the Advaita Vedanta tradition propounded by Adi Shankara, the first Shankaracharya.

Etymology 
The word Prabhu means Lord or a Chief in Sanskrit language.

History
The name Chandraseniya may be a corruption of the word Chandrashreniya, meaning from the valley of the Chenab River (also known as "Chandra"). This theory states that the word Kayastha originates from the term Kaya Desha, an ancient name for the region around Ayodhya. The CKP claim descent from Chandrasen, an ancient kshatriya king of Ujjain and Ayodhya and of the Haihaya family of the lunar Kshatriya Dynasty.

During the times of the Shilahara dynasty of Konkan (around the 10th century), the Silhara kings were known to invite for settlement into their lands, Brahmins and Kshatriyas of the northern Indo-Gangetic valley. These are the Goud Saraswat Brahmin and the CKP.
In fact, epigraphical evidences i.e. engravings from the Shilahara times have been found in Deccan to prove that many CKPs held high posts and controlled the civilian and military administration. For example, a Shilahara inscription around A.D. 1088 mentions the names of a certain Velgi Prabhu. Lakshmana Prabhu is mentioned as a MahaDandanayaka (head of military) and MahaPradhana (prime minister); Ananta-Prabhu is mentioned as a MahaPradhana (prime minister), Kosadhikari (Head of treasury) and Mahasandhivigrahika (charge of foreign department). According to Historian and researcher S.Muley, these epigraphs might be the first available evidences of the existence of the CKP in Maharashtra.

Kayastha chiefs claiming Kshatriya varna ruled over vast swathes of land in Andhra country, and they are recorded in Andhra history dating back to the 13th century CE.

The CKPs have traditionally been placed in the Kshatriya varna.

According to a letter written by the Shankaracharya, who confirmed the 'Vedadhikar' of the CKPs, the title Prabhu, which means high official, must have been given to the CKPs by the Shilahar kings of Konkan.
The Shankaracharya has also formally endorsed their Kshatriya status by citing various sanskrit scriptures; especially
one scripture that explicitly called them Chandraseniya Kshatriyas. He also cited documents from Banares and Pune Brahmins ratified by Bajirao II himself that proved their rights over the Vedas. His letter is addressed to all Brahmins.

According to the American Indologist and scholar of Religious Studies and South Asian Studies who is the Professor of International Studies and Comparative Religion at the University of Washington, Christian Lee Novetzke 

The CKPs, described as a traditionally well-educated and intellectual group, came into conflict with Chitpawan at least 350 years ago over their rights to be teachers and scholars. As such they competed with the Brahmins in the 18th and 19th centuries for government jobs. They even demanded privileges of the Brahmin order – the rights to conduct the vedic rituals (all by themselves) and satkarma (all six karmas of the Brahmin order) for which they were opposed especially by the Chitpawans. University of Toronto historians and Professors Emeriti, Milton Israel and N.K Wagle opine about this as follows in their analysis:

Deccan sultanate and Maratha Era

The CKP community became more prominent during the Deccan sultanates and Maratha rule era. During Adilshahi and Nizamshahi, CKP, the Brahmins and high status Maratha were part of the elites. Given their training CKP served both as civilian and military officers. Several of the Maratha Chhatrapati Shivaji's generals and ministers, such as Murarbaji Deshpande and Baji Prabhu Deshpande, and Khando Ballal Chitnis were CKPs.

In 17th century Maharashtra, during Shivaji's time, the so-called higher classes i.e. the Marathi Brahmins, CKPs and Saraswat Brahmins, due to social and religious restrictions were the only communities that had a system of education for males. Except these three castes, education for all other castes and communities was very limited and consisted of listening to stories from religious texts like the Puranas or to Kirtans and thus the common masses remained illiterate and backward. Hence Shivaji was compelled to use people from these three educated communities - Marathi Brahmins, CKPs and Saraswat Brahmins - for civilian posts as they required education and intellectual maturity. However, in this time period, these three as well as other communities, depending on caste, also contributed their share to Shivaji's "Swaraj"(self-rule) by being cavalry soldiers, commanders, mountaineers, seafarers etc.

During this period,  some prominent CKPs like Pilaji Prabhu Deshpande (the son of Baji Prabhu Deshpande) and Shamji Kulkarni (the son of Raoji Narao Kulkarni) were converted to Islam. The conversion happened after being taken as prisoners in war campaigns. After their escape, conversions back to Hinduism were done using Brahminical rituals performed after authorization by the Brahmins, under the minister "Panditrao". Thus, they were accepted back not only into Hinduism but also the CKP community.

During the Peshwa era, the CKP's main preceptor or Vedic Guru was a Brahmin by the name of Abashastri Takle, who was referred to by the CKP community as "Gurubaba". Sale of liquor was banned by the Brahmin administrators to the Brahmins, CKPs, Pathare Prabhus and Saraswat Brahmins but there was no objection to other castes drinking it or even to the castes such as Bhandaris from manufacturing it. Gramanyas i.e. "dispute involving the supposed violation of the Brahmanical ritual code of behavior"  were very common in that era and some Chitpawans, at times, initiated Gramanya against other communities – Prabhu communities (CKP, Pathare Prabhu), Saraswats and Shukla Yajurvedis. They did not come to fruition however. The analysis of gramanyas against the CKP was done in depth by historians from the University of Toronto. Modern scholars quote statements that show that they were due to political malice – especially given that the Gramanya was started by a certain Yamaji Pant who had sent an assassin to murder a rival CKP. This was noted by Gangadharshastri Dikshit who gave his verdict in favor of the CKPs. Abashastri Takle had used the scriptures to establish their "Vedokta". Similarly, the famous jurist Ramshastri Prabhune also supported the CKPs Vedokta. Modern scholars conclude that the fact that the CKPs held high ranking positions in administration and the military and as statesmen was a "double edged sword". Historians, while analyzing the gramanyas state "As statesmen, they were engulfed in the court intrigues and factions, and, as a result, were prone to persecution by opposing factions. On the other hand, their influence in the court meant that they could wield enough political clout to effect settlements in favor of their caste.". The gramanyas during the Peshwa eras finally culminated in the favor of the CKPs as the Vedokta had support from the Shastras and this was affirmed by two letters from Brahmins from Varanasi as well as one from Pune Brahmins ratified by Bajirao II himself. The late Indian professor of sociology, Govind Sadashiv Ghurye commented on the strictness of the caste system during the Peshwa rule in Maharashtra by noting that even advanced caste such as the Prabhus had to establish rights to carry on with the vedic rituals.

As the Maratha empire/confederacy expanded in the 18th century, and given the nepotism of the Peshwa of Pune towards their own Chitpavan Brahmin caste, CKP and other literal castes migrated for administration jobs to the new Maratha ruling states such as the Bhosale of Nagpur, the Gaekwads, the Scindia, the Holkars etc.,
The Gaekwads of Baroda and the Bhosale of Nagpur gave preference to CKPs in their administration.

In 1801-1802 CE (1858 Samvat), a Pune-based council of 626 Brahmins from Maharashtra, Karnataka and other areas made a formal declaration that the CKPs are twice-born (upper caste) people who are expected to follow the thread ceremony (munja).

British era and later
During the British colonial era, the two literate communities of Maharashtra, namely the Brahmins and the CKP were the first to adopt western education with enthusiasm and prospered with opportunities in the colonial administration. A number of CKP families also served the semi-independent princely states in Maharashtra and other regions of India, such as Baroda.

The British era of the 1800s and 1900s saw the publications dedicated to finding sources of CKP history
The book 'Prabhu Kul Deepika' gives the gotras (rishi name) and pravaras etc. of the CKP caste.
Another publication, "Kayastha-mitra"(Volume 1, No.9. Dec 1930) gives a list of north Indian princely families that belonged to the CKP caste.

Rango Bapuji Gupte, the CKP representative of the deposed Raja Pratapsinh Bhosale of Satara spent 13 years in London in the 1840s and 50s to plead for restoration of the ruler without success. At the time of the Indian rebellion of 1857, Rango tried to raise a rebel force to fight the British but the plan was thwarted and most of the conspirators were executed. However, Rango Bapuji escaped from his captivity and was never found.

At times, there were Gramanyas, also known as "Vedokta disputes", initiated by certain individuals who tried to stop CKP rights to Upanayana. These individuals based their opinion on the belief that no true Kshatriyas existed in the Kali Yuga; however the upanayana for CKPs were supported by prominent Brahmin arbitrators like Gaga Bhatt and Ramshastri Prabhune who gave decisions in the favor of the community. In the final Gramanya, started by Neelkanthashastri and his relative Balaji Pant Natu, a rival of the CKP Vedic scholar V.S.Parasnis at the court of Satara, the Shankaracharya himself intervened as arbiter and he gave his verdict by fully endorsing the rights over Vedas for the CKP. The Shankaracharya's letter is addressed to all Brahmins and he refers to various Shastras, earlier verdicts in the favour of the CKPS as well as letters about the lineage of the CKP to make his decision and void the dispute started by Natu.

When the prominent Marathi historian Vishwanath Kashinath Rajwade contested their claimed Kshatriya status in a 1916 essay, the CKP writer Prabodhankar Thackeray wrote a text outlining the identity of the caste, and its contributions to the Maratha empire. In this text, Gramanyachya Sadhyant Itihas, he wrote that the CKPs "provided the cement" for Shivaji's swaraj (self-rule) "with their blood".

Gail Omvedt concludes that during the British era, the overall literacy of Brahmins and CKP was overwhelmingly high as opposed to the literacy of others such as the Kunbis and Marathas for whom it was strikingly low.

In 1902, all communities other than Marathi Brahmins, Saraswat Brahmins, Prabhus (Chandraseniya Kayastha Prabhus, Pathare Prabhus) and Parsi were considered backward and 50% reservation was provided for them in by the princely state of Kolhapur. In 1925, the only communities that were not considered backward by the British Government in the Bombay Presidency were Brahmins, CKP, Pathare Prabhus, Marwaris, Parsis, Banias and Christians.

In Pune, the descendents of Sakharam Hari Gupte donated premises for conducting thread ceremonies and marriages for the members of the CKP community and the facilities were available to other communities as well.

According to the studies by D.L.Sheth, the former director of the Center for the Study of Developing Societies in India (CSDS), educated upper castes and communities - Punjabi Khatris, Kashmiri Pandits, CKPs, the Chitpawans, Nagar Brahmins, South Indian Brahmins, Bhadralok Bengalis, etc., along with the Parsis and upper crusts of the Muslim and Christian society were among the Indian communities in 1947, at the time of Indian independence, that constituted the middle class and were traditionally "urban and professional" (following professions like doctors, lawyers, teachers, engineers, etc.). According to P. K. Varma, "education was a common thread that bound together this pan Indian elite" and almost all the members of these communities could read and write English and were educated "beyond school"

Culture

The mother tongue of most of the community is now Marathi, though in Gujarat they also communicate with their neighbours in Gujarati, and use the Gujarati script, while those in Maharashtra speak English and Hindi with outsiders, and use the Devanagari script.

The CKP historically performed three "vedic karmas"(studying vedas, fire sacrifice, giving alms) as opposed to full("Shatkarmi") Brahmins who performed six vedic duties which also include accepting gifts, teaching Vedas to other and performing vedic rites for others. They also followed  rituals, like the sacred thread (Janeu) ceremony, the observation of the period of mourning and seclusion by person of a deceased's lineage by the CKPs has traditionally been for 10 days although Kshatriyas generally observe it for 12 days. Educationally and professionally, 20th century research showed that the Saraswat, CKP, Deshastha and Chitpawan were quite similar. Researcher and professor Dr.Neela Dabir sums it up as follows "In Maharashtra for instance, the family norms among the Saraswat Brahmins and CKPs were similar to those of the Marathi Brahmins". However, she also criticizes these communities by concluding that until the 20th century, the Marathi Brahmin, CKP and Saraswat Brahmin communities, due to their upper-caste ritualistic norms, traditionally discouraged widow remarriage. This resulted in distress in the lives of widows from these castes as opposed to widows from other Marathi Hindu castes.

They worship Ganesh, Vishnu and other Hindu gods. Many are devotees of Sai Baba of Shirdi. Some CKPs may also be devotees of the religious swamis from their own caste –  and "Gajanan Maharaj (Gupte)", who took samadhis at Kalyan (in 1919) and Nasik (in 1946) respectively. Many CKP clans have Ekvira temple at Karle as their family deity whereas others worship Vinzai, Kadapkarin, Janani as their family deity

The CKPs share many common rituals with the upper-caste communities and the study of Vedas and Sanskrit. Unlike most upper-caste Marathi communities however, the CKPs, through their interaction with Muslims and residence in the coastal Konkan region, have adopted a diet which includes meat, fish, poultry and eggs.

CKPs have had a progressive attitude regarding female education compared to other communities. For example, Dr.Christine Dobbin's research concludes that the educationally advanced communities in the 1850s – the CKPS, Pathare Prabhus, Saraswats, Daivadnya Brahmin and the Parsis were the first communities in the Bombay Presidency that allowed female education.

Notable people
Baji Prabhu Deshpande (1615–1660), commander of Shivaji's forces who along with his brother died defending Vishalgad in 1660
Murarbaji Deshpande (?–1665), commander of Shivaji's forces who died defending the fort of Purandar against the Mughals in 1665
Balaji Avaji Chitnis, Private secretary of Shivaji. He was one of the highest raking ministers in his Durbar.
 Khando Ballal Chitnis- Con of Balaji avaji Chitnis. High-Ranking courtier of the Maratha Empire.He served under Sambhaji, Rajaram, Tarabai and Shahu.( -1712)

Sakharam Hari Gupte (1735–1779), a General of Raghunathrao Peshwa responsible for conquering Attock on the banks of the Indus and repelling the Durrani ruler, Ahmad Shah Abdali out of India in the 1750s. Later he was involved in the plot against Peshwa Narayanrao
Vithal Sakharam Parasnis (17xx-18xx)- Sanskrit, Vedic and Persian scholar; consultant to British Historian James Grant Duff; author of the Sanskrit "karma kalpadrum"(manual for Hindu rituals); first head of the school opened by Pratapsimha to teach Sanskrit to the boys of the Maratha caste
Lakshman Jagannath Vaidya, Dewan Bahadur of the princely state of Baroda during British Raj era.
Narayan Jagannath Vaidya (18xx–1874), introduced educational reforms in Mysore and Sindh (now in Pakistan). The Narayan Jagannath High School (popularly known as NJV School in Karachi) is named after him to acknowledge his contributions to education in the region.
Rango Bapuji Gupte (1800 –missing 5 July 1857), Lawyer for Pratapsingh of Satara, tried to organise a rebellion against the British in 1857.
Mahadev Bhaskar Chaubal (1857–1933), Indian origin British era Chief Justice of the Bombay High Court. Member of Executive Council of Governor of Bombay in 1912 and Member of Royal Commission on Public Services in India.
Ram Ganesh Gadkari (1885–1919), playwright and poet who was presented the Kalpana Kuber and Bhasha Prabhu awards
Shankar Abaji Bhise (1867–1935), scientist and inventor with 200 inventions and 40 patents. The American scientific community referred to him as the "Indian Edison".
Narayan Murlidhar Gupte (1872–1947), Marathi poet and a scholar of Sanskrit and English.
Prabodhankar Thackeray (1885–1973), anti-dowry, anti-untouchability social activist, politician and author. Father of Bal Thackeray
Shankar Ramchandra Bhise (1894-1971), popularly known as "Acharya Bhise" or "Bhise Guruji", was a social reformer, educationalist and novelist devoted to the education and upliftment of the Adivasi community in the early 20th century.
Vasudeo Sitaram Bendrey (1894–1986), historian, credited for discovering the true portrait of Shivaji and creating records called "Bendrey's indices". He won the Maharashtra state award for his biography on Sambhaji.
Gangadhar Adhikari (1898-1981) - Indian communist leader, former general secretary of the Communist Party of India and prominent scientist.
Surendranath Tipnis, social reformer and the chairman of the Mahad Municipality in the early 1900s. Helped Ambedkar during the Mahad Satyagraha by declaring its public spaces open to untouchables. Awarded the titles 'Dalitmitra'(friend of the dalits) and 'Nanasaheb'.
C. D. Deshmukh (1896–1982), first recipient of the Jagannath Shankarseth Sanskrit Scholarship, awardee of the Frank Smart Prize from the University of Cambridge, topper of ICS Examination held in London, first Indian Governor of RBI, first finance Minister of Independent India and tenth vice chancellor of the University of Delhi.
Dattatreya Balakrishna Tamhane (1912–2014), a Gandhian freedom fighter, litterateur and social reformer. He won the Maharashtra State government's award for literature
B. T. Ranadive (1904–1990), popularly known as BTR was an Indian communist politician and trade union leader.
Kusumavati Deshpande (1904–1961), Marathi writer and first female president of the Marathi Sahitya Sammelan. Wife of the Marathi poet, Atmaram Ravaji Deshpande 
Kumarsen Samarth, film director, his biggest success being the 1955 Marathi film Shirdi che Saibaba. Father of actresses Nutan and Tanuja and husband of Shobhana Samarth.
Shobhna Samarth (1916–2000), film actress of the 1940s. She was mother of actresses Nutan and Tanuja.
Kamal Ranadive (1917–2001) - Prominent Indian biologist and scientist, well known for her work on relationship between virus and cancer. 
Ahilya Rangnekar (1922–2009), founder of Maharashtra state unit of the All India Democratic Women's Association. Leader of the Communist Party of India and B T Ranadive's younger sister
Nalini Jaywant (1926–2010), film actress of the 1940s and 1950s. She was the first cousin of Shobhna Samarth
Vijaya Mehta, actor and director on Marathi stage, television and film
Bal Thackeray (1926–2012), founder of Shiv Sena and founder-editor of the Saamana newspaper
Anant Damodar Raje (1929–2009) - Indian architect and academic.
Kushabhau Thakre (1922–2003), Notable Politician and Former Party President of Bharatiya Janata Party
Arun Shridhar Vaidya (1926–1986 ), 13th Chief of Army Staff of the Indian Army
Mrinal Gore (1928–2012),Socialist party leader of India. She earned the sobriquet Paaniwali Bai (water lady) for her effort to bring drinking water supply to Goregaon, a North Mumbai suburb.
Bhalachandra Vaidya (1928–2018) – Known as "Bhai" Vaidya (Bhai means Brother in Hindi) was Mayor of Pune city, freedom fighter and reformer who went to jail 28 times fighting for the cause of Dalits, farmers and backward classes. He was known for his honesty and non-corrupt attitude.
Bhalchandra Gopal Deshmukh (1929–2011), ex-cabinet secretary of India and author of several books
Nutan (1936–1991), she holds the record of five wins of the Best Actress award at Filmfare, which was held only by her for over 30 years until it was matched by her niece Kajol Mukherjee in 2011.
Tanuja She established herself as the most popular and commercially successful Indian actress. Tanuja is the mother of famous actresses, Kajol and Tanisha.
Shashikumar Madhusudan Chitre (1936–2021) - Indian astrophysicist and mathematician. Best known for his work on solar physics and gravitational lensing. He is awarded by Padma Bhushan in 2012.
Shrinivas Khale ( 1926–2011) - Padma Bhushan awardee, music composer in five languages Marathi, Hindi, Sanskrit, Bengali and Gujarati
Dilip Purushottam Chitre (1938–2009) - Well known Marathi-English writer and poet, recipient of Sahitya Akademi Award.
Vijay Karnik Indian Armed forces
Kiran Karnik Indian administration
Samir Karnik Indian film director, producer and screenwriter
Subodh Karnik American executive and former CEO of the ATA Airlines
Gauri Karnik Indian actress
Madhu Mangesh Karnik Indian literary activist
Ganesh Karnik Indian politician; Member of Legislative Council at Karnataka Legislative Council
Sadashiva S. Karnik professor of molecular medicine at Case Western Reserve University

References
Notes

Citations

Prabhu Communities of Maharashtra
Kayastha
Social groups of Maharashtra
Ethnoreligious groups in Asia
Marathi people